Lennox Passage Provincial Park is a small picnic and beach park on the shores of Lennox Passage on the North Shore of Isle Madame on Cape Breton Island, Nova Scotia, with  of shoreline, an operating lighthouse and site of a former post office (c. 1910), ferry terminal and two limestone quarries. In summer the park offers swimming, kayaking, and biking opportunities. There are snowshoeing and cross-country skiing opportunities in the winter, however parking is available at the gate only in the off-season.

Lennox Passage Provincial Park was established by Order in Council (OIC 85-227) on March 12, 1985.

Grandique Point Lighthouse
Located in the park is the historic Grandique Point Lighthouse.

History

The first Grandique Point Light, also known as Grandique Ferry Light, a pole light, was established at Grandique in 1884. After the opening of the St. Peters Canal, Lennox Passage saw an increase in marine traffic. For safety reasons, lighthouses were established along the route. The first lightkeeper was Daniel Clough, son of the merchant Nathaniel Cough, a recipient of one of the first Crown Land grants on Isle Madame. In the late 1800s the lighthouse was flanked by docks for limestone and plaster quarries and quays for the Isle Madame farmers to bring their produce and livestock to market. There was also a passenger ferry that landed on Grandique Pointe quite near the lighthouse. Many of these features can still be seen today.

Due to erosion at the Grandique spit of land, the pole light was moved in 1900 and in 1906 a proper lighthouse was built. Storm damage caused the Grandique Point lighthouse to be moved for a second time. In the winter of 2010, the lighthouse was moved to its present location.

The last lightkeeper at Grandique was Stanley Forgeron who took over in 1960. In 1961 Forgeron oversaw the conversion to an automated light in 1961 and became caretaker.

Lightkeepers at Grandique Point

 Daniel Clough	1884-1908
 D A Kaulbach	1908-1909
 C A Kaulbach	1909-1919
 Charles Shannon	1909-1923
 John Doiron	
 Henry Young	
 Melvin Shannon	1939-1960
 Stanley Forgeron	 1960-1961
 Stanley Forgeron (as caretaker)	1961-1968

References

External links

"Lennox Passage Provincial Park", Provincial Park and Park Reserve Series, includes map.

Provincial parks of Nova Scotia
Hiking trails in Nova Scotia
Tourist attractions in Richmond County, Nova Scotia